The Sound Burger (AT770; marketed in the United States as the Mister Disc) is a portable record player that was sold starting in 1983 by Audio-Technica. It was battery operated and meant to be used away from home, and it came with a set of fold-away headphones, and was able to play both 33- and 45-RPM records. Audio-Technica produced a limited-edition revival in 2022, making 7,000 units.

Specifications

2022 limited edition 

On 1 November 2022, to celebrate the  anniversary of Audio-Technica, a batch of 7000 new Sound Burgers were announced and available for purchase for $199.99, which quickly got sold out. The units are all in red, with some changes from the original AT770 model such as: a new AT-SB2022 model number, a rechargeable battery charged through USB-C, Bluetooth audio connection, normal buttons along with indicator lights instead of toggle switches, and a plaque to the back commemorating the anniversary and bearing the serial number of the unit within the batch. On 5 January 2023, Audio-Technica announced a wider re-release of this edition without the commemorative plaque.

References

Portable audio players
Products introduced in the 20th century
Turntables